The Last of the Finest, also released as Blue Heat, is a 1990 American crime action film directed by John Mackenzie and starring Brian Dennehy, Joe Pantoliano, Jeff Fahey, and Bill Paxton

Plot
The film opens at Canyon Park where narcotics cop Frank Daly (Brian Dennehy) is coaching his partners Wayne Gross (Joe Pantoliano), Ricky Rodriguez (Jeff Fahey), and Howard Jones (Bill Paxton) during a flag football game. After the game, Daly tells Captain Joe Torres (Henry Darrow) that his team is working on a major bust. He asks Torres to help keep the DEA out of the operation.

Later that night, Daly and his team surveil a massive drug deal at a meat processing plant. However, when Daly radios Torres for backup, the Captain orders him to wait for the DEA to show up. Daly ignores the order. During the raid, Anthony Reece (Michael C. Gwynne) and his main henchman torch the money earned during the deal, setting the whole plant on fire.

Reece and his henchman drive up to a diplomatic retreat in the mountains to inform their superior, R.J. Norringer (Guy Boyd), about the fate of the money. Cpt. Torres suspends Daly and his team pending an investigation. The team use their free time during their suspension to make good on their promise to install a septic tank at Canyon Park. Through one of their informants, Fast Eddie (Xander Berkeley), Daly arranges for a prostitute to meet with Reece and surveil him further. As Reece waits for the prostitute, Rodriguez witnesses him receive an envelope from someone who he later learns is a DEA agent.

Eddie calls Daly to tell him that Reece was a psycho, and he viciously beat the prostitute. Daly and the team heads to the motel where Eddie and the prostitute are hiding, but before they can get there, Reece's henchman kills them both. Jones chases the henchman, who lays a trap for Jones and kills him.

Daly is charged with violating the terms of his suspension, resulting in Jones' death. Daly resigns in disgust. Gross resigns in solidarity. Rodriguez initially does not want to resign, because being a cop is his whole identity, but he eventually agrees to resign and pursue the case as civilians with the rest of the team. They raise $29,000 for their operation by knocking over some local drug dealers.

The team trails Reece to an event for the Central American Relief Fund, where they witness Norringer give a speech advocating support for Central American rebel forces. On the roof of the building, they videotape Reece meeting with Norringer. They visit retired cop Tommy Grogan (John Finnegan), who reads Reece and Norringer's lips to determine that there is a major deal going down the next night.

As the team investigates Norringer's harbor operation, Captain Torres visits Grogan with Reece's henchman to determine what he told Daly's team. At Norringer's warehouse, the team realizes that the drug sales are used to finance weapons purchases on behalf of Central American rebels. Norringer's men give chase, and the team escapes in one of the loaded trucks. After they crash it into an overpass, they find that it is loaded with over $22 million.

They hide the cash in the cesspool at the park. As they clean up afterward, they find Grogan's body in a locker. Realizing that their families are in danger, they gather all of their loved ones in an secluded spot and debate their next step. They agree to pursue the case, rather than run off with the money. Daly confronts Torres about Grogan, and he confesses to his involvement in the scheme, explaining that he just does not care anymore about right and wrong.

Daly sets up an exchange at the park, with Gross and Rodriguez hiding in sniper positions. They have also planted small charges around the field. When Torres and Norringer arrive, a gunfight ensues. The police arrive, because Torres had called them in a final act of contrition, and they help Daly and his team defend themselves. Norringer, Torres, and Reece are all killed in the firefight. The film closes with the rededication of Canyon Park in Jones' honor. Daly is back in uniform, and the camera lingers on a TV where Norringer's handler, a corrupt white house aide, denies involvement in the scheme while expressing support for the rebels.

Cast
Brian Dennehy as Frank Daly
Joe Pantoliano as Wayne Gross
Jeff Fahey as Ricky Rodriguez
Bill Paxton as Howard Jones
Michael C. Gwynne as Anthony Reece
Henry Darrow as Captain Joe Torres
Burke Byrnes as Commander Orsini
Xander Berkeley as Fast Eddie
Guy Boyd as R.J. Norringer
John Finnegan as Tommy Grogan
J. Kenneth Campbell as Lauren Calvert
Deborra-Lee Furness as Linda Daly

Production 
Production began on November 7, 1988 under the working title Street Legal. Director John Mackenzie performed an uncredited re-write on the original script, filming wrapped up in early 1989, The film's original title, Street Legal, had to be changed because there was already a popular Canadian television show of the same name, so the film's title was changed to Point of Impact, but that title was jettisoned quickly and replaced with The Last of the Finest.

Release
The film was originally set to be released on October 20, 1989, but was delayed for a few months. The film was released on March 9, 1990. The film was released under the title Blue Heat In several international markets.

Critical Reaction
Owen Gleiberman gave the film an "F", writing, "Scene for humdrum scene, The Last of the Finest may be the dullest thriller ever made...[it] doesn't deserve to take up space on a video-store shelf, let alone a theater screen." Variety called it "a rarely attempted brand of pastiche film". Writing in The New York Times, Janet Maslin took time to credit the cinematography of Juan Ruiz-Anchia for its "crisp, clear look". She found the fact that the stolen money was stored in a septic tank unsubtle.

References

External links

1990 films
Films directed by John Mackenzie (film director)
Films produced by John Davis
Films scored by Michael Hoenig
Films scored by Jack Nitzsche
American police detective films
Orion Pictures films
Davis Entertainment films
1990s English-language films
1990s American films